This is a list of Danish television related events from 2005.

Events
12 February - Jakob Sveistrup is selected to represent Denmark at the 2005 Eurovision Song Contest with his song "Tænder på dig". He is selected to be the thirty-third Danish Eurovision entry during Dansk Melodi Grand Prix held at the Forum Horsens in Horsens.
1 April - Jill Liv Nielsen becomes the winner of Big Brother Reality All-Stars which was the last season of the reality television show to air on TV Danmark.
4 June - Klovn actress Mia Lyhne and her partner Thomas Evers Poulsen win the first season of Vild med dans.
25 November - The Eagle actor David Owe and his partner Vickie Jo Ringgaard win the second season of Vild med dans.

Debuts
7 February - Klovn (2005-2009)
16 April - Vild med dans (2005–present)

Television shows

1990s
Hvem vil være millionær? (1999–present)

2000s
The Eagle (2004-2006)

Ending this year
Big Brother (2001-2005, 2012–2014)

Births

Deaths

See also
 2005 in Denmark